Arcata Ball Park is a collegiate baseball venue in the Western United States, located in Arcata, California. Opened in 1941, it is the home of the summer collegiate Humboldt Crabs. Arcata Ball Park is located at the corner of F Street and 9th Street in downtown Arcata, near the Plaza. The ballpark is tightly surrounded by a bus station on the third base side, busy F Street on the first base side, the Arcata Police Station and library behind right field, and Highway 101 just over the left field fence.

Humboldt Crabs

The summer collegiate Humboldt Crabs are Arcata Ball Park's primary tenant and have been for over fifty years. The Crabs, who formed in 1945, are the oldest continuously operated summer collegiate baseball team in the country, celebrating their 75th consecutive season in 2019. 

The Crabs have won the California National Baseball Congress championship many times, advancing to the NBC World Series in Wichita, Kansas, for most of the 1960s, '70s, and '80s. 

Over 65 former Crabs have gone on to play in the MLB. These include Bruce Bochte, Craig Lefferts, Mike Harkey, Mike Redmond, and Dane Iorg.

Renovations
In June 1952, the light poles were moved and raised 10 feet, a 20-foot fence was installed in left and center field, and home play was moved 8 feet closer to the grandstands and the entire diamond moved along with it, all to accommodate the new freeway, Highway 101. In May 1978, just weeks before the start of the Humboldt Crabs season, the City of Arcata tore out the redwood grandstand, "condemned by a dry rot problem," and replaced it with new all-aluminum bleachers, for approximately 1500 fans, on a newly poured concrete slab that included a ramp entrance to replace the old stairs. The original estimated cost of $34,600 was exceeded, and the bleaches did not arrive before the start of the season on June 10, 1978, so bleachers were borrowed from St. Bernard's School, and with the cost overruns many of the planned improvements were not made for decades.

Between August 1974 and October 1976, CalTrans expanded Highway 101 from four lanes to eight lanes, so the city had to put up a taller fence in left field to keep home runs off the highway as much as possible. A new press booth was built before the start of the 1980 season and dedicated to longtime PA announcer and Times-Standard sports editor Don Terbush. That wooden press booth was used until a new metal media booth was built in front of the old booth in 2019.

In 2006, after years of playing with a softball field in right field, the park was renovated and the softball infield and backstop were removed.

Between the 2018 and 2019 seasons, the City of Arcata installed new ADA regulation bleaches, able to seat approximately 909 fans, to replace the old bleachers that would sway every time you stood up and had been in use since 1978. The city is also talking about building a new press box and building NCAA regulations dugouts. The current dugouts are chain-link fence with no roof.

See also
 Nettleton Stadium
 Harry & David Field
 Kiger Stadium
 Miles Field demolished in 2005
 Tiger Field
 Appeal-Democrat Park
 Travis Credit Union Park demolished 2008

References

External links
 City of Arcata Park Website
 Arcata Ball Park official site

Baseball venues in California
Buildings and structures in Arcata, California
1941 establishments in California
Sports venues completed in 1941
High school baseball venues in the United States
Cal Poly Humboldt Lumberjacks baseball
College baseball venues in the United States